Colgate Raiders ice hockey may refer to either of the ice hockey teams that represent Colgate University:
Colgate Raiders men's ice hockey
Colgate Raiders women's ice hockey